Louis X may refer to:

 Louis X of France, "the Quarreller" (1289–1316).
 Louis X, Duke of Bavaria (1495–1545)
 Louis I, Grand Duke of Hesse (1753–1830).
 Louis Farrakhan (formerly Louis X), head of the Nation of Islam